Angram Grange is a small civil parish in the Hambleton district of North Yorkshire, England, about 7 miles south-east of Thirsk.  According to the 2001 census it had a population of 17. In 2015 the population was estimated at 20.

The parish was originally a township in the parish of Coxwold.

References

Civil parishes in North Yorkshire